Toyota Motor Corporation's T family is a family of 4-speed and 5-speed light/medium-duty transmissions found in Toyota cars.

T40

Ratios:
 First Gear: 3.587:1
 Second Gear: 2.022:1
 Third Gear: 1.384:1
 Fourth Gear: 1.00:1

Applications:
 1982 Corona with 3A engine
 1983 Corona with 1S/3T-E engine
 -1981 TA40, 1983 Carina with 3A/2T engine
 1983 Celica with 1S engine
 1975-1979 Corolla with 2TC engine (shorter shifter in tail shaft in this version)
 1980-1982 Corolla with 3TC engine
 KA67 Carina Station Wagon with 5K engine (22 spline) K bell housing with hydraulic clutch.

T50

Ratios:
 First Gear: 3.587:1
 Second Gear: 2.022:1
 Third Gear: 1.384:1
 Fourth Gear: 1.00:1
 Fifth Gear: 0.861:1

Applications:
 1982-1983 Carina with AA60 - 3A. /1S/3T-E/2T engine 
 1982 Corona with 1S engine
 1983 Celica with 3T-E/2T-E engine
 1984 Corolla with 2A engine
 1980-1982 Corolla with 3TC engine
 1983-1987 Corolla with 4AC/ 4AGEU/ 3AU/ 4AU engine
 1975-1979 Corolla with 2TC engine (shorter shifter on tail shaft in this version)

Notes:
 Comes in two varieties: 20 and 22-splines on the output shaft.
 There are several aftermarket companies, like Toyota Racing Development (TRD) and Quaife, who sell different gears for the T50 transmission.

TRD package #1 ratios:
 First Gear: 2.630:1
 Second Gear: 1.891:1
 Third Gear: 1.384:1
 Fourth Gear: 1.00:1
 Fifth Gear: 0.861:1

TRD package #2 ratios:
 First Gear: 2.341:1
 Second Gear: 1.607:1
 Third Gear: 1.195:1
 Fourth Gear: 1.00:1
 Fifth Gear: 0.886:1

Quaife ratios:
 First Gear: 2.347:1
 Second Gear: 1.733:1
 Third Gear: 1.379:1
 Fourth Gear: 1.144:1
 Fifth Gear: 1.00:1

TecArt's N2-1 ratios:
 First Gear: 2.341:1
 Second Gear: 1.607:1
 Third Gear: 1.383:1
 Fourth Gear: 1.000:1
 Fifth Gear: 1.196:1 (3.5-speed)

BattleGarage/MFactory
 Fifth Gear: 0.737:1

See also
 Toyota P transmission

References

External links
 Toyota Transmissions

T